is a Japanese boxer. He competed in the men's heavyweight event at the 1964 Summer Olympics. At the 1964 Summer Olympics, he lost to Athol McQueen of Australia.

References

1942 births
Living people
Japanese male boxers
Olympic boxers of Japan
Boxers at the 1964 Summer Olympics
Place of birth missing (living people)
Heavyweight boxers